Holgate High School is a public high school in Holgate, Ohio, United States. It is the only high school in the Holgate Local Schools district.

Ohio High School Athletic Association State Championships 
 Boys Baseball – 1937 
 Boys Basketball – 2004

References

External links 
 

High schools in Henry County, Ohio
Public high schools in Ohio